Twist and Shout is a Philippine game show that premiered July 3, 2010 airing every weekend on ABS-CBN. It is based on the Sing If You Can franchise owned by Zodiak Entertainment. The show is hosted by the country's leading singers, Gary Valenciano and Martin Nievera. Three kings teams must sing to two-minute songs while being challenged to obstacles and distractions.

Format 
Two teams of celebrities will play three rounds of challenges/distractions. Contestants will be made to perform the nation's greatest hits while facing a range of hilarious and humorous physical distractions. Each will be given two minutes to sing. A jury of three will decide which team gets the point for each round. However, on the October 9–10 episodes, the first three games were set on Saturday while on Sunday another three games were set, which combined from Saturday's scores. The team with the highest score automatically proceeded to the turntable.

Distractions
The Running Machine — Contestant has to run faster in a treadmill before falling into foam.
Ice Dip — Contestant must dip in this ice tub while singing. 
The Volcano — Contestant has to sing in this smoke blenching volcano.  
The Masseuse — Contestant will sing getting massaged. 
Tap Out — Contestant must sing with a wrestler carrying the contestant.(only for male contestants)  
The Dodge Pool — The team must sing in a pool getting hit by balls thrown by their opponents.  
The Ballooney Tunes — Contestant will sing with balloons popping from his/her shirt.
The Swing Galing — Contestant has to sing in this swing. 
The Bully — Contestant must sing in this bull-type ride or will fall off. 
The Wrecking Ball — Contestant has to sing getting wrecked by balls pushed by the opponent team.
The Laughy Toughy — Contestant must get tickled by feathers while singing.
The Doh-Yo — Contestant will sing with two sumo wrestlers bumping into him/her. 
The Depulation — Contestant must sing getting his legs waxed. 
The Fly Away — Contestant has sing while bungee jumping.

The Turntable
At the end of round three, the team with the most points wins. They get to play in the final round, the Turntable. They, then, will win P1,000 for every second they stay singing in the Turntable. If they finish the full two minutes in the Turntable, they win the jackpot prize of P200,000. The studio audience is divided into Red Team and Blue Team. Three members of the winning team's supporters also get to share the same prize the celebrity team wins.

Judges
Three judges will be present each episode. They will decide which team gets the point for each round.

 Resident Judge
 Guest Judge

Awards
 25th PMPC Star Awards For TV (Best Game Show)- Nominated

References

External links
Official website

ABS-CBN original programming
Philippine television series based on British television series
Philippine game shows
Musical game shows
Karaoke television series
2010 Philippine television series debuts
2010 Philippine television series endings
Filipino-language television shows